Matheson Alexander Lang (May 15, 1879 – April 11, 1948) was a Canadian-born stage and film actor and playwright in the early 20th century.  He is best remembered for his performances roles in Great Britain in Shakespeare plays.

Biography
Lang was born in Montreal, Quebec, Canada, the son of Rev. Gavin Lang of Inverness, Scotland, and a cousin of Cosmo Gordon Lang, who would later become Archbishop of Canterbury.

Lang was educated at Inverness College and the University of St Andrews.
He made his stage debut in 1897.  He became known for his Shakespearean roles in such plays as Hamlet, Macbeth, and Romeo and Juliet.  He also appeared in plays by Henrik Ibsen and George Bernard Shaw.  He performed in the theatrical companies of Sir Frank Benson, Lillie Langtry, and Ellen Terry.

In 1903 he married actress Nelly Hutin Britton in London.  In 1906 he played Tristram in Joseph Comyns Carr's play Tristram and Iseult at the Adelphi Theatre,  with Lily Brayton as Iseult and Oscar Asche as King Mark; Lang's wife played Arganthael. Asche afterwards usually referred to Lang as "Tristram".

Lang and his wife subsequently formed their own company, which toured India, South Africa, and Australia from 1910-13 performing Shakespeare.  In 1913, Lang returned to England and created one of his most memorable roles, the title character in Mr. Wu.  He reprised this part in a 1919 silent film, and became so identified with the role that he titled his 1940 memoirs Mr. Wu Looks Back.  In 1914, he and Britton successfully produced The Taming of the Shrew, The Merchant of Venice, and Hamlet at the Old Vic.

In 1916, Lang became one of the first major theatre stars to act on film, as Shylock in The Merchant of Venice, with his wife as Portia.  He went on to appear in over 30 films and was one of Britain's leading movie stars of the 1920s.  Among his memorable roles were Guy Fawkes (1923), Matthias in The Wandering Jew (1923) (which also featured his wife as Judith), Henry IV in Henry, King of Navarre (1924), and Henry V in Royal Cavalcade (1935).

Lang also wrote the plays Carnival (1919) and The Purple Mask (1920), both of which were produced on Broadway and made into films.
The film The Chinese Bungalow (1940 film), was adapted from his play of the same name, in which he had, in his turn, played the lead of Yuan Sing, in the first film adaptation, in 1926, and again, in 1930.

In 1940 the Langs were staying with their old friend Dornford Yates and his wife at their house near Pau in France when France surrendered. The Langs had to escape from the advancing Germans through Spain to Portugal.

Matheson Lang died in Bridgetown, Barbados, at age 68.

Selection of Lang's stage performances
 Tristram and Iseult as Tristram (Adelphi Theatre, 1906)
 Pete as Pete Quilliam (1908)

Filmography

 The Merchant of Venice (1916) as Shylock (film debut)
 The Ware Case (1917) as Sir Hubert Ware 
 The House Opposite (1917) as Henry Rivers MP 
 Masks and Faces (1917) as Coachman 
 Everybody's Business (1917) as Lieutenant Jack Goudron 
 Victory and Peace (1918) as Edward Arkwright 
 Mr. Wu (1919) as Mr. Wu
 Carnival (1921) as Sylvio Steno 
 A Romance of Old Baghdad (1922) as Prince Omar 
 Dick Turpin's Ride to York (1922) as Dick Turpin
 Jealousy (1923) as Jan Steen 
 The Wandering Jew (1923) as Mattathias 
 Guy Fawkes (1923) as Guy Fawkes
 Henry, King of Navarre (1924) as Henry of Navarre
 Slaves of Destiny (1924) as Luke Charnock 
 White Slippers (1924) as Lionel Hazard
 Port of Lost Souls (1924) 
 The Secret Kingdom (1925) as John Quarrain 
 The Qualified Adventurer (1925) as Peter Duff
 The Chinese Bungalow (1926) as Yuan Sing 
 The Island of Despair (1926) as Stephen Rhodes 
 The King's Highway (1927) as Paul Clifford
 The Blue Peter (1928) as David Hunter 
 The Triumph of the Scarlet Pimpernel (1928) as Sir Percy Blakeney 
 The Chinese Bungalow (1930) as Yuan Sing 
 Carnival (1931) as Sylvio Steno 
 Channel Crossing (1933) as Jacob Van Eeden 
 The Great Defender (1934) as Sir Douglas Rolls 
 Little Friend (1934) as John Hughes
 Royal Cavalcade (1935) as Henry V
 Drake of England (1935) as Sir Francis Drake
 The Cardinal (1936) as Cardinal de Medici (final film)

Notes

References
 Mr Matheson Lang and Miss Hutin Britton - Rudolph De Cordova, Westminster Abbey Press, 1909.
 Mr Wu Looks Back (1940) - Lang's Memoirs

External links

 Matheson Lang's profile at the Emory University Shakespeare Project
 Matheson Lang profile on Collectors' Post
 Matheson Lang profile on Silent Movie

1879 births
1948 deaths
Actor-managers
Canadian people of Scottish descent
Canadian male stage actors
Canadian male film actors
Canadian male silent film actors
Canadian male Shakespearean actors
19th-century Canadian male actors
20th-century Canadian male actors